Warrior is a city in Jefferson and Blount counties in the State of Alabama. At the 2020 census, the population was 3,224. It is a northern suburb of Birmingham.

History
Warrior was incorporated in either 1889 or 1899, though most records cite the 1889 date. The city derives its name from the nearby Black Warrior River.

Geography
Warrior is the northernmost city in Jefferson County, with outlying parts of the city in Blount County. It is traversed by I-65 and U.S. Highway 31.

Warrior is located at 33°48'48.985" North, 86°48'41.238" West (33.813607, -86.811455).

Warrior is in the Central time zone.

City government

Warrior uses the mayor/council form of government. The city council consists of the mayor and five members. The city is divided into five geographic districts with each one electing a council member to represent it.

After having served as Warrior's longest-serving mayor and the only woman to hold the position, Rena Hudson, who became Warrior's first female mayor in 1984, recently retired to spend more time with her husband of 57 years, Bill Hudson, a retired home builder. She died on March 15, 2017, and had served as the Mayor of Warrior from 1984 to 2000 and again from 2004 to 2012.

The current mayor of Warrior is Johnny Ragland.

The first mayor of Warrior was William Anderson White.

Annual events
Warrior Day, a yearly town festival, is held each year in early autumn. Entertainment and food vendors set up in town in addition to a large swap meet.

Attractions
Featuring limestone formations, blind cave fish, and an underground pool, Rickwood Caverns is a recognized member of the National Caves Association, and offers more than a mile of living geology.

Sports
Warrior is home of the 1992/1993 Class 2A (AHSAA) Boys' Basketball Champions from the former Warrior High School. In 1996, the Olympic Torch was relayed through the city during the weeks leading up to the 1996 Summer Olympic Games in Atlanta.

Demographics

2020 census

As of the 2020 United States census, there were 3,224 people, 1,647 households, and 957 families residing in the city.

2010 census
As of the census of 2010, there were 3,176 people, 1,336 households, and 886 families living in the city. The racial makeup of the city was 83.1% White, 14.2% Black or African American, 0.2% Native American, 0.4% Asian, 0.2% from other races, and 1.8% from two or more races. Hispanic or Latino of any race were 0.8% of the population.

There were 1,336 households, out of which 24.6% had children under the age of 18 living with them, 44.2% were married couples living together, 15.7% had a female householder with no husband present, and 33.7% were non-families. 29.3% of all households were made up of individuals, and 10.3% had someone living alone who was 65 years of age or older.  The average household size was 2.37 and the average family size was 2.92.

In the city, the age distribution of the population showed 21.4% under the age of 18, 8.6% from 18 to 24, 26.0% from 25 to 44, 28.0% from 45 to 64, and 15.9% who were 65 years of age or older. The median age was 40.3 years. For every 100 females, there were 91.7 males.

The median income for a household in the city was $35,851, and the median income for a family was $44,583. Males had a median income of $43,504 versus $30,081 for females. The per capita income for the city was $25,263. About 11.4% of families and 12.5% of the population were below the poverty line, including 6.4% of those under the age of 18 and 16.2% ages 65 and older.

2000 census
As of the census of 2000, there were 3,169 people, 1,302 households, and 898 families living in the city. The racial makeup of the city was 83.21% White, 15.40% Black or African American, 0.41% Native American, 0.16% Asian, 0.03% from other races, and 0.79% from two or more races. Hispanic or Latino of any race were 0.32% of the population.

There were 1,302 households, out of which 28.6% had children under the age of 18 living with them, 49.1% were married couples living together, 16.1% had a female householder with no husband present, and 31.0% were non-families. 28.5% of all households were made up of individuals, and 15.1% had someone living alone who was 65 years of age or older.  The average household size was 2.43 and the average family size was 2.98.

In the city, the age distribution of the population showed 22.8% under the age of 18, 9.5% from 18 to 24, 26.8% from 25 to 44, 24.1% from 45 to 64, and 16.8% who were 65 years of age or older.  The median age was 39 years.  For every 100 females, there were 87.4 males.

The median income for a household in the city was $28,143, and the median income for a family was $35,697. Males had a median income of $32,306 versus $20,486 for females. The per capita income for the city was $14,919.  About 12.1% of families and 11.0% of the population were below the poverty line, including 15.9% of those under the age of 18 and 13.3% ages 65 and older.

Media

Warrior is served by Birmingham TV stations. Birmingham is part of the Birmingham/Anniston/Tuscaloosa television market, which is the nation's 39th largest. The major television affiliates are:
WBRC 6 (FOX)
WBIQ 10 (PBS)
WVTM 13 (NBC)
WTTO 21 (CW)
WBMA-LD 33/40 (ABC)
WIAT 42 (CBS)
WPXH 44 (ION)
WABM 68 (MyNetworkTV).

Local publications include The North Jefferson News (weekly) and The Birmingham News (three times a week).

Education
Warrior Elementary School is located in Warrior, and the city is served by Mortimer Jordan High School and North Jefferson Middle School in nearby Kimberly.

Notable people
John Arnold Austin, recipient of the Navy Cross
 Spencer Brown,  American football running back
Harry Salmon, baseball pitcher in the Negro leagues

References

Cities in Alabama
Cities in Jefferson County, Alabama
Cities in Blount County, Alabama
Birmingham metropolitan area, Alabama
Populated places established in 1872
1872 establishments in Alabama